Domenico Maietta (born 3 August 1982) is an Italian former professional footballer who played as a defender.

Career
Although Maietta was once included in the Serie A rosters of Juventus and Perugia in the early 2000s, he did not make his Serie A debut until 2013, after being promoted with Hellas Verona. He made his Serie B debut with Triestina during the 2002–03 season.

Maietta missed 3 weeks in 2016–17 season.

On 1 September 2020 Empoli announced his retirement from playing and that he joined the club staff.

References

External links
 
 Hellas Verona F.C. Official Player Profile 

1982 births
Living people
Sportspeople from the Province of Cosenza
Association football defenders
Italian footballers
Serie A players
Serie B players
Serie C players
Juventus F.C. players
L'Aquila Calcio 1927 players
U.S. Triestina Calcio 1918 players
A.C.R. Messina players
U.S. Avellino 1912 players
A.C. Perugia Calcio players
F.C. Crotone players
Frosinone Calcio players
Hellas Verona F.C. players
Bologna F.C. 1909 players
Empoli F.C. players
Footballers from Calabria